A gyro gunsight (G.G.S.) is a modification of the non-magnifying reflector sight in which  target lead (the amount of aim-off in front of a moving target) and bullet drop are calculated automatically. The first examples were developed in Britain just before the Second World War for use during aerial combat, and more advanced models were common on Allied aircraft by the end of the war.

The amount of lead required to hit a target is a function of the rate of turn of the attacking aircraft and the range to the target. The former is measured using a gyroscope in the sight, while the latter is estimated by the pilot by moving a dial or pointer so that a reticle in the sight matches the wingspan of the target. Post-war models added a small radar to automate the range measurement; these are known as radar gunsights.

Gyro sights usually contained more than one reticle to assist in proper aiming: a fixed one, often just a dot, signifying the direction the guns are pointing, a moving one showing the corrected aiming point, and a ring to match to a target plane's known wingspan. A particularly advanced model, the K-14 found in the North American P-51 Mustang, had separate projectors and displays for air and ground attacks.

History

In 1936 Royal Aircraft Establishment scientist Leslie Bennet Craigie Cunningham suggested using a gyroscope's resistance to rotation to modify the aiming point in a gun sight to compensate for deflection caused by a turning aircraft. This arrangement meant the information presented to the pilot was of his own aircraft, that is the deflection/lead calculated was based on his own bank-level, rate of turn, airspeed etc. The assumption was that the flight path was following the flight path of the target aircraft, as in a dogfight, therefore the input data was accurate enough to provide useful output data to the pilot.

British developments

Mark I

After tests with two experimental gyro gunsights which had begun in 1939, the first production gyro gunsight was the British Mark I Gyro Sight, developed at Farnborough in 1941. To save time in development the sight was based on the already existing type G prismatic sight, basically a telescopic gun sight folded into a shorter length by a series of prisms. Prototypes were tested in a Supermarine Spitfire and the turret of a Boulton Paul Defiant in the early part of that year. With the successful conclusion of these tests the sight was put into production by Ferranti, the first limited-production versions being available by the spring of 1941, with the sights being first used operationally against Luftwaffe raids on Britain in July the same year. The Mark I sight had a number of drawbacks, however, including a limited field of view, erratic behaviour of the reticle, and requiring the pilot/gunner to put their eye up against an eyepiece during violent manoeuvres.

Mark II

Production of the Mark I was postponed and work started on an improved sight. Changes involved incorporating the gyro adjusted reticle into a more standard reflector sight system, a non magnifying optical sight that had been in use  since 1918. Reflector sights consisting of a 45 degree angle glass beam splitter that sat in front of the pilot and projected an illuminated image of an aiming reticle that appeared to sit out in front of the pilot's field of view at infinity and was perfectly aligned with the plane's guns ("boresighted" with the guns). The sight sat some distance away from the pilot, so it was safer to use and didn't impair the pilot’s field of view. The optical nature of the reflector sight meant it was possible to feed other information into field of view. In the reflector sight version, range was measured by comparing the wingspan of the target seen through the sight to a pre-set number. The pre-set number was selected via a large dial on the front of the sight, and the range was then measured by turning another dial on the aircraft's throttle. This new sight became the Mark II Gyro Sight, which was first tested in late 1943 with production examples becoming available later in the same year. Ferranti built a new factory in the Crewe Toll area of Edinburgh, Scotland to build the sights. This factory would later go on to be the center for Ferranti's long history in radar development.

The Mark II was also subsequently produced in the US by Sperry as the K-14 (USAAF) and Mk18 (Navy). The K-14 included two projector systems for the reflector sight, one with gyro correction for attacking aircraft, and a second for attacking ground targets. It was otherwise similar to the British models, although the dial for adjusting the target size was moved to the left side of the sight instead of the front. The area where the Mark II had the dial was replaced by a moving scale that indicated the current range to the target, along with a large pad that prevented pilot head injuries in the case of rapid deceleration.

The radar-aimed AGLT Village Inn tail turret incorporated a Mark II Gyro Sight and this turret was fitted to some Lancaster bombers towards the end of World War II.

German developments
Although since 1935 the relevant German companies offered the Reich Air Ministry (RLM) a new type of gyro-stabilized sight, the well-proven REVI (Reflexvisier, or reflector sight) remained in service for combat aircraft. The gyro-stabilized sights received an additional designation of EZ (Einheitszielvorrichtung, or Target Predictor Units), such as EZ/REVI-6a.

The development of the EZ 40 gyro sight began in 1935 at the Carl Zeiss and Askania companies, but was of low priority. Not until the beginning of 1942, when a US P-47 Thunderbolt fighter equipped with a gyro-stabilised sight was captured, did the RLM speed up research. In the summer of 1941, the EZ 40, for which both the Carl Zeiss and Askania companies were submitting their developments, was rejected. Tested in a Bf 109 F, Askania's EZ 40 produced 50 to 100% higher hit probability compared to the then standard sight, the REVI C12c. In the summer of 1943 an example of the EZ 41 developed by the Zeiss company was tested, but was refused because of too many faults.

In the summer 1942, the Askania company began work on the EZ 42, a gunsight which could be adjusted for the target's wingspan (in order to estimate distance to the target). Three examples of the first series of 33 pieces were delivered in July 1944. These were followed by further 770 units, the last being delivered by the beginning of March 1945. Each unit took 130 labour hours to produce. The EZ 42 was made up by two major parts, and lead computation was provided by two gyroscopes. The system, weighing 13.6 kg (30 lb) complete, of which the reflector sight was 3.2 kg, was ordered into mass production at the Steinheil company in Munich. Approximately 200 of the sights were installed into Fw 190 and Me 262 fighters for field testing. The pilots reported that attacks from 20 degrees deflection were possible, and that although the maximum range of the EZ 42 was stated as approximately 1,000 meters, several enemy aircraft were shot down from a combat distance of 1,500 meters. 

The EZ 42 was compared with the Allied G.G.S. captured from in a P-47 Thunderbolt in September 1944 in Germany. Both sights were tested in the same Fw 190, and by the same pilot. The conclusion was critical of the moving graticule of the G.G.S., which could be obscured by the target. Compared to the EZ 42, the Allied sight's prediction angle was found on average to be 20% less accurate, and vary by 1% per degree. Tracking accuracy with the G.G.S. measured as the mean error of the best 50% of pictures was 20% worse than with the EZ 42.

Usage (Mark II Gyro Sight)

 Avro Lincoln
 Blackburn Firebrand
 Chance Vought F-4U Corsair
 de Havilland Hornet & Sea Hornet
 de Havilland Mosquito
 de Havilland Vampire
 de Havilland Venom & Sea Venom
 Fairey Firefly
 Gloster Meteor
 Hawker Hurricane
 Hawker Tempest
 Hawker Typhoon
 Hawker Fury & Sea Fury
 Hawker Sea Hawk
 Lockheed P-80 Shooting Star
 North American P-51 Mustang
 North American F-86 Sabre
 North American F-100 Super Sabre
 Republic P-47 Thunderbolt
 Republic F-84 Thunderjet
 Supermarine Attacker
 Supermarine Seafang
 Supermarine Spiteful
 Supermarine Spitfire

See also
 Head-up display – the further evolution of the gyro reflector gunsight

References

Bibliography

 Hahn, Fritz. Deutsche Geheimwaffen 1939–1945. Flugzeugbewaffungen. Heidenheim: Erich Hoffmann Verlag, 1963.

External links

A more complete explanation of the gyro gunsight
RAF, Luftwaffe and USAAF gunsights of WW2
www.cocpitinstrumente.de – EZ 40 Kreiselvisier (in German)

Military optical devices
British inventions
Ferranti